British diesel and electric multiple units may refer to:

British electric multiple units
British railcars and diesel multiple units